WSA may refer to:

 van der Waals surface area 
 War Shipping Administration, part of the US government responsible for building cargo ships in World War II
 Weapon storage area, a maximum security part of an ammunition depot where nuclear weapons are stored
 West Allerton railway station, Liverpool, England (station code)
 Western Sahara Authority
 Western Soccer Alliance
 Western Sydney Airport, an international airport currently under construction
 Wilderness study area
 Windows Socket API, Microsoft's implementation of Berkeley sockets 
 Windows Subsystem for Android, a compatibility layer for Android apps in Windows 11
 Women's Squash Association, the governing body for the women's professional squash circuit and the women's world rankings
 Worker Student Alliance, a division of Students for a Democratic Society, sometimes referred to as SDS-WSA
 Workers' Solidarity Alliance
 World Service Authority
 World Summit Award
 WSA Process, Wet gas Sulphuric Acid is a Wet Catalysis Process
 Web Services Addressing
 United Nations World Summit Awards